Cassius Clay vs. Alejandro Lavorante was a heavyweight professional boxing match.

Clay (soon Muhammad Ali) fought the Argentinian Lavorante in a ten-round match in the Los Angeles Memorial Sports Arena on July 20, 1962. Clay won the bout by knocking out Lavorante in the fifth round.

References

Lavorante
1962 in boxing
July 1962 sports events in the United States